Captain Archibald Haddock is a fictional character in The Adventures of Tintin, the comics series by Belgian cartoonist Hergé. He is one of Tintin's best friends, a seafaring pipe-smoking Merchant Marine Captain.

Haddock is initially depicted as a weak and alcoholic character under the control of his treacherous first mate Allan, who keeps him drunk and runs his freighter. He regains his command and his dignity, even rising to president of the Society of Sober Sailors (The Shooting Star), but never gives up his love for rum and whisky, especially Loch Lomond, until the final Tintin adventure, Tintin and the Picaros, when Professor Calculus 'cures' him of his taste for alcohol. In the adventure Secret of the Unicorn (and continuing in Red Rackham's Treasure) he and Tintin travel to find a pirate's treasure captured by his ancestor, Sir Francis Haddock (François de Hadoque in French). With newfound wealth and regaining his ancestral home Marlinspike Hall, Captain Haddock becomes a socialite; riding a horse, wearing a monocle, and sitting in a theatre box seat (The Seven Crystal Balls).
He then evolves to become genuinely heroic, volunteering to sacrifice his life to save Tintin's own in the pivotal Tintin in Tibet. In later volumes he is clearly retired.

Throughout it all, the Captain's coarse humanity and sarcasm act as a counterpoint to Tintin's often implausible heroism. He is always quick with a dry comment whenever the boy reporter gets too idealistic.

Character history 
Until Haddock's introduction, Tintin's constantly positive, optimistic perspective was offset by his faithful companion Snowy. Before Haddock, Snowy was the source of all dry and cynical side-commentary for the series. Hergé, however, realised Haddock's potential as a foil to Tintin. After he brought Haddock into the series, the Captain took over the role of the cynic, relieving Snowy and establishing Captain Haddock as a permanent addition to the cast.

Hergé introduced Captain Haddock in The Crab with the Golden Claws as the whisky-sodden captain of the Karaboudjan, a merchant vessel used—without Haddock's knowledge—by his first mate Allan Thompson for smuggling drugs inside crab tins. Because of his alcoholism and temperamental nature, his character was weak and unstable, at times posing as great a hazard to Tintin as the villains of the piece. He was also short-tempered, given to emotional expletive-ridden outbursts, and capable of infuriating behaviour; at one point he even attacks Tintin when, while traversing the Moroccan desert, he has the sun-induced delusion that Tintin is a bottle of champagne. However, Haddock is a sincere figure in need of reform, and by the end of his first adventure Tintin has gained a loyal companion, albeit one still given to uttering the occasional "expletive". 

Hergé also allowed himself more artistic expression through Haddock's features than with Tintin's, and with Haddock offering more range in dynamism, Hergé found himself connecting with his stories less through Tintin over time. Michael Farr, author of Tintin: The Complete Companion (2001), notes: "Whereas Hergé kept Tintin's facial expressions to a bare minimum, Haddock's could be contorted with emotion. In Haddock, Hergé had come up with his most inspired character since creating Tintin."

Sales of the volume in which Haddock was introduced indicated the character was well received. After a fairly serious role in The Shooting Star, where he has risen to become the President of the Society of Sober Sailors (replete with a cabin full of whisky), Haddock takes a more central role in the next adventure, split over two books, The Secret of the Unicorn and Red Rackham's Treasure—indeed, his family history drives the plot. He discovers Marlinspike Hall, the chateau owned by his forebears, which during Unicorn is owned by the villainous Bird brothers. Upon locating the treasure, the newly wealthy Haddock retires to Marlinspike, where Nestor, the former butler of the Bird brothers, is reemployed as Haddock's own. Haddock attempts, to mixed success, to become more refined and posh in The Seven Crystal Balls. He does so by, among other things, attending the Opera, making greater use of Nestor, parting his hair and wearing formal dress (a running joke in the book is how he goes through about a dozen monocles after they keep breaking). This phase ends before the book is over, as Haddock's grief over the abduction of Professor Calculus causes him to abandon his attempts at being aristocratic, and return to his iconic "old seadog" way of dressing. This shows the persistent nature of his seafaring humility, and deep down, his undeniable dislike of the pretentious. 

Hergé built the next adventure around Haddock, furnishing the character with his ancestral home of Marlinspike Hall. Harry Thompson, author of Tintin: Hergé and his creation, writes that the introduction of this large and luxurious country house was "to provide a suitable ancestral home for Tintin and himself to move into." To achieve this in terms of the plot, Hergé also details Haddock's ancestry, something Thompson regards as distinctive: "Haddock is the only regular character whose relatives turn up in the Tintin stories at all (if one discounts Jolyon Wagg and his dreadful family)."As Haddock's role grew, Hergé expanded his character, basing him upon aspects of friends, with his characteristic temper somewhat inspired by Tintin colourist E.P. Jacobs and his bluffness drawn from Tintin artist Bob de Moor. Harry Thompson has commented on how Hergé utilised the character to inject humour into the plot, notably "where Haddock plays the fool to smooth over a lengthy explanation."

Captain Haddock is especially notable in The Red Sea Sharks, where his skillful captaining of the ship he and Tintin seize from Rastapopoulos allows them to survive until they are rescued, and is especially noble in the pivotal Tintin in Tibet, volunteering to sacrifice his life to save Tintin's own. By the time of their last completed and published adventure, Tintin and the Picaros, Haddock had become such an important figure that he dominates much of the story.

Captain Haddock's taste for alcoholic beverages is a constant feature of the character. He is especially fond of whisky from the Loch Lomond distillery (which was fictional at the time when the character was developed, the real Loch Lomond distillery was only founded later), and at the end of the album Explorers on the Moon, he falls into a coma upon re-entry to Earth, but he immediately wakes up upon hearing the word "whisky". In the last completed Tintin album Tintin and the Picaros, Haddock is involuntarily cured from his alcoholism by an invention of Professor Calculus's, a pill that causes the taste of alcohol to turn horribly repulsive upon ingestion.

Captain (Archibald) Haddock's ancestor, Sir Francis Haddock, is hinted at being the illegitimate son of the French Sun King (Louis XIV), a possible reference to Hergé's own family history—Hergé liked to believe that his father was the illegitimate son of the Belgian king Leopold II.

Name 
As Hergé was considering names for his new character, he asked his wife, Germaine, what she had cooked for dinner. She told him, "a sad English fish—haddock.” Hergé thought this was a perfect name for Tintin’s new mariner friend, and so Captain Haddock was born.

There was a real 20th-century ship's master bearing this unlikely but appropriate surname: Captain Herbert Haddock had been the skipper of the famous White Star Line's passenger vessel Olympic. He had also been temporarily at the helm of Olympic's even more famous sister ship Titanic before Titanic was officially handed over to White Star for her doomed 1912 maiden voyage.

Another famous namesake, and a possible inspiration for the Captain's ancestor Sir Francis, was the English admiral Richard Haddock, a veteran of the Anglo-Dutch Wars. The grandfather of Richard Haddock, also a sea captain, commanded the ship of the line HMS Unicorn during the reign of Charles I.

Bianca Castafiore has a difficult time remembering Haddock's name. In The Castafiore Emerald, she confuses his name with malapropisms such as "Paddock", "Harrock", "Padlock", "Hopscotch", "Drydock", "Stopcock", "Maggot", "Bartók", "Hammock", and "Hemlock".

The fictional Haddock remained without a first name until the last completed story, Tintin and the Picaros (1976), when the name Archibald was suggested.

The name appears in Hergé's notes in 1938. According to Philippe Goddin, author of Hergé – Chronologie d'une oeuvre, it is inspired by the German French-language film Captain Craddock. In The Crab with the Golden Claws, Haddock sings one of the film songs, Les gars de la Marine.

Expletives 
At the time of Captain Haddock's introduction to the series in 1940, the character's manners presented a problem to Hergé. As a sailor, Haddock would need to have a very colourful vocabulary, but Hergé could not use any swear words as he knew his audience included children. The solution reportedly came when Hergé recalled how around 1933, shortly after the Four-Power Pact had come into being, he had overheard a market trader use the word "four-power pact" as an insult. Struck by this use of an "irrelevant insult", Hergé hit upon the solution of the Captain using strange or esoteric words that were not actually offensive, but which he would project with great anger, as if they were very strong curse words. These words ranged across a variety of subject areas, often relating to specific terms within scientific fields of study. This behaviour would in later years become one of Haddock's defining characteristics.

The idea took form quickly; the first appearance of the Haddockian argot occurred in The Crab with the Golden Claws when the Captain storms towards a party of Berber raiders yelling expressions like "jellyfish", "troglodyte" and "ectoplasm". This use of colourful insults proved successful and was a mainstay in subsequent books. Hergé started collecting these types of words for use in Haddock's outbursts, and on occasion even searched dictionaries to come up with inspiration.

As a result, Captain Haddock's colourful insults began to include "bashi-bazouk", "visigoths", "kleptomaniac", "sea gherkin", "anacoluthon", "pockmark", "megacycle", "nincompoop", "abominable snowman", "nitwits", "scoundrels", "steam rollers", "parasites", "vegetarians", "floundering oath", "carpet seller", "blundering Bazookas", "Popinjay", "bragger", "pinheads", "miserable slugs", "ectomorph", "maniacs", "pickled herring"; "freshwater swabs", "miserable molecule of mildew","Logarithm", "bandits", "orang-outangs", "cercopithecuses", "Polynesians", "iconoclasts", "ruffians", "fancy-dress freebooter", "ignoramus", "sycophant", "dizzard", "black-beetle", "pyrographer", "slave-trader" and "Fuzzy Wuzzy", but again, nothing actually considered a swear word.

On one occasion this scheme apparently backfired. Once when the captain was in a particularly angry state, Hergé had him yell the word "pneumothorax" (a medical emergency caused by the collapse of the lung within the chest). A week after the scene appeared in Tintin magazine, Hergé received a letter allegedly from a father whose boy was a great fan of Tintin and also a heavy tuberculosis sufferer who had experienced a collapsed lung. According to the letter, the boy was devastated that his favourite comic made fun of his own condition. Hergé wrote an apology and removed the word from the comic. Afterwards, the letter was discovered to be fake, written and planted by Hergé's friend and collaborator Jacques Van Melkebeke.

In addition to his many insults, the most famous of Haddock's expressions relate to any of a number of permutations of two phrases: "Billions of bilious blue blistering barnacles!" ("Mille millions de mille milliards de mille sabords!"; lit.: "A thousand millions of a thousand billions of a thousand portholes!") and "Ten thousand thundering typhoons!" ("Tonnerre de Brest!"; lit.: "Thunder of Brest"). Haddock uses these two expressions to such an extent that Abdullah actually addresses him as "Blistering Barnacles" ("Mille sabords" – "A thousand portholes" – in the original version).

Émile Brami, biographer of Louis-Ferdinand Céline, claimed in a 2004 interview with the French book magazine Lire that Hergé took his inspiration from Céline's anti-Semitic pamphlet Bagatelles pour un massacre (1937) to create some of Haddock's expressions, as some of them ("aztec," "coconut," "iconoclast," "platypus") appeared explicitly in Céline's book.

Adaptations 

Captain Haddock was portrayed by Georges Wilson in Tintin and the Golden Fleece, by Jean Bouise in Tintin and the Blue Oranges, and by David Fox in The Adventures of Tintin (TV series).

On BBC Radio 4, he was portrayed by Leo McKern in Series One and by Lionel Jeffries in Series Two.

In both the 1960s and 1990s television series, Haddock spoke with an Irish accent. In the latter he was voiced by David Fox with a light Northern Irish/Ulster accent.

In the animated movie Tintin and the Lake of Sharks, he was voiced by Claude Bertrand.

In the 2011 film The Adventures of Tintin: The Secret of the Unicorn, Andy Serkis supplies the voice and motion capture performance of Captain Haddock (adopting a Scottish accent) as well as his ancestor, Sir Francis Haddock. Just as in the comic, he is initially portrayed as a drunk, who is always in search of alcohol. Tintin endeavours to cure the captain of his alcoholism, but eventually discovers that it is an essential component of his character.

Commemorative statues and murals 

 A mural on a building at Rue de l'Etuve recreates a scene of Tintin, Captain Haddock and Snowy coming down a building fire escape from The Calculus Affair.
 The Gare du Midi station in Brussels contains a huge reproduction of a panel from Tintin in America.
 The Stockel subway station in Brussels has huge panels with scenes from Tintin comic books painted as murals.
 One of the high speed trains of Thalys (Tintin train) running between Brussels and Paris is covered with images from Tintin comic books including those of Captain Haddock.
 An advertisement of Thalys shows Captain Haddock on a train platform with his trademark seabag, appearing to have stepped out of a Thalys train.
 A life size resin statue of Captain Haddock was created and displayed at the 2012 San Diego International Comics Convention (WETA booth)

See also 
 List of The Adventures of Tintin characters

References

Bibliography

External links 
Captain Haddock's Curses – an A to Z list

Comic book sidekicks
Comics characters introduced in 1941
Fictional alcohol abusers
Fictional astronauts
Fictional British people
Fictional explorers
Fictional sea captains
Fictional socialites
Hergé characters
Male characters in comics
Tintin characters